Leandro Sarmatz is a Brazilian writer and journalist. He was born in Porto Alegre and now lives in São Paulo. He studied at PUC-RS. Sarmatz was an editor at the publishing house Companhia das Letras, leaving it in 2016 to establish a new publishing house, Todavia. He is also a columnist and journalist for a number of Brazilian media outlets. 

He is the author of the play Mães e sogras (2000), the poetry collection Logocausto (2009) and the short story collection Uma fome (2010). He was named by Granta magazine as one of the best young writers in Brazil.

References

Brazilian writers
People from Porto Alegre
Pontifical Catholic University of Rio Grande do Sul alumni
Year of birth missing (living people)
Living people